The 1914 season of the Paraguayan Primera División, the top category of Paraguayan football, was played by 6 teams. The national champions were Olimpia.

Results

Standings

National title play-offs

External links
Paraguay 1914 season at RSSSF

Paraguayan Primera División seasons
Para
1